The 2010–11 LFL Season was the second season of the Lingerie Football League. The league featured 10 teams in various cities across the United States. For the 2010–11 season, the league launched two expansion franchises in the Orlando Fantasy and Baltimore Charm, while the Denver Dream and New York Majesty suspended operations because of issues with home venues.

After the 2009–10 season, in which all games were broadcast exclusively on the internet, the league returned to traditional television for 2010. All games, except for the Lingerie Bowl, were broadcast in edited form on MTV2. The Lingerie Bowl aired on pay-per-view alongside the Super Bowl.

The 2010 LFL All-Fantasy Game was held June 10, 2010, in Monterrey, Mexico, with the Eastern Conference prevailing over the Western Conference 36–14. The All-Fantasy Game's co-MVPs were the Philadelphia Passion's Tyrah Lusby and the Miami Caliente's Anonka Dixon.

The season kicked off on August 27, 2010, and culminated with Lingerie Bowl VIII on February 6, 2011. The LFL Eastern and Western Conference playoff games were played back-to-back on January 29, 2011, at Veterans Memorial Arena in Jacksonville, Florida. The 2011 Lingerie Bowl, played during halftime of Super Bowl XLV, was held at the Thomas & Mack Center in Las Vegas between the Eastern Conference champion Philadelphia Passion and the Western Conference champion Los Angeles Temptation. Los Angeles Temptation won back-to-back titles by defeating the Philadelphia Passion 26–25.

Teams

Schedule

Standings

Eastern Conference

Western Conference

 - clinched playoff berth

Playoffs

Awards
LFL Awards Announcement
League MVP
 Ashley Salerno - Los Angeles Temptation
 Heather Furr - Chicago Bliss
 Marirose Roach - Philadelphia Passion
 Deborah Poles - Chicago Bliss

Offensive Player of the Year
 Marirose Roach - Philadelphia Passion
 Ashley Salerno - Los Angeles Temptation
 Heather Furr - Chicago Bliss
 Anonka Dixon - Miami Caliente

Defensive Player of the Year
 Deborah Poles - Chicago Biss
 Danika Brace - Seattle Mist
 Danielle Hawkins - Dallas Desire
 Liz Gorman - Tampa Breeze

Rookie of the Year
 Ashley Salerno - Los Angeles Temptation
 Marirose Roach - Philadelphia Passion
 Heather Furr - Chicago Bliss
 Christie Bell - Philadelphia Passion

Coach of the Year
 Chandler Brown - Philadelphia Passion
 Yo Murphy - Tampa Breeze
 Chris Michaelson - Seattle Mist
 David Bizub - Los Angeles TemptationMortaza Award Natalie Jahnke - Los Angeles Temptation Monique Gaxiola - Los Angeles Temptation
 Shelly Lashley - Philadelphia Passion
 Carie Small - Tampa Breeze
 Lauren Le Bella - Philadelphia PassionTeam of the Year Chicago Bliss
 Tampa Breeze
 Los Angeles Temptation
 Philadelphia PassionLingerie Bowl MVP Ashley Salerno - Los Angeles Temptation'''

References

Lingerie Football League
Legends Football League